Ross Ewen Beever (3 January 1946 – 3 June 2010) was a New Zealand geneticist and mycologist.

Academic career
Born in Te Kuiti, Beever completed a MSc at Auckland University with a thesis Growth of fungi on potato extract media and a PhD at Leeds entitled Genetic and biochemical studies of phosphoenolpyruvate carboxykinase in Neurospora crassa.

On his return to New Zealand he worked for DSIR and later Landcare Research, principally on Botrytis cinerea and other important plant diseases including Phytoplasma australiense, responsible for cabbage tree mortality, and Phytophthora species responsible for Kauri dieback.

He was elected a Fellow of the Royal Society of New Zealand in 2004.

Beever died in Auckland in 2010. The Ross Beever Memorial Mycological Award was established by the New Zealand Mycological Society in 2014. Fungus taxa named in his honour include the species Colletotrichum beeveri and Cortinarius beeverorum, and the genus Rossbeevera.

References

New Zealand geneticists
New Zealand mycologists
1946 births
2010 deaths
People from Te Kūiti
Alumni of the University of Leeds
University of Auckland alumni
People associated with Department of Scientific and Industrial Research (New Zealand)
Fellows of the Royal Society of New Zealand
20th-century New Zealand scientists
21st-century New Zealand scientists